The Fayette County Courthouse and the Fayette County Jail are two historic buildings in La Grange, Texas. The courthouse was designed by James Riely Gordon and built in 1891 by Martin, Byrne and Johnston. The jail was built earlier in 1881 by Fritz Schulte and designed by John Andrewartha and James Wahrenberger. Both buildings were added to the National Register of Historic Places (NRHP) as a single listing on January 23, 1975. and designated a Texas State Antiquities Landmark on January 1,1981 by the Texas Historical Commission (THC). Texas historical marker number 12627 erected in 2001 commemorates the courthouse's status as a Recorded Texas Historic Landmark, marker no. 18757 placed in 2017 does likewise for the jail. On January 16, 2001 both buildings were designated and recorded in the NRHP as contributing properties to the Fayette County Courthouse Square Historic District.

Photo gallery

References

External links

		
National Register of Historic Places in Fayette County, Texas
Buildings and structures completed in 1881